Good Times Burgers & Frozen Custard is a Lakewood, Colorado-based fast-food restaurant specializing in premium burgers and frozen custard. The chain operates 35  locations: 33 in Colorado, and 2 in Wyoming.

History
In 1968, Round the Corner Restaurants was started in Boulder, Colorado, and established a chain of gourmet, sit down hamburger restaurants. At its peak, Round the Corner had 30 restaurants in 4 states.

In 1986, Round the Corner formed a company to develop the Good Times drive-through concept. By 1987 as Good Times Drive-Thru Burgers, the company opened its first location in Boulder.

Between 1990 and 1993, Round the Corner became a subsidiary of Good Times Restaurants, Inc., and was spun off into a separate company in 1995. Round the Corner filed for bankruptcy in 1996, with Good Times as the only secured creditor. By 2000, the last remaining Round the Corner restaurant, located in Aurora, Colorado, had been sold to an independent operator.

In 2005, Good Times began a test agreement with Taco John's to open co-branded restaurants. 
In 2007, Good Times introduced new Bambino Burgers, slider hamburgers similar to those sold by White Castle.

In 2013, Good Times acquired a 48-percent interest in North Carolina-based franchiser Bad Daddy's Burger Bar, described as a "full service, upscale, 'small box' restaurant concept". The agreement included development rights for franchise locations in the states of Colorado, Arizona, and Kansas. In 2015, Good Times announced it would be acquiring the remaining 52 percent of Bad Daddy's for $21 million.

Frozen custard

Flavor of the month
Good Times has many flavors of frozen custards that rotate depending on the month as well as serving vanilla year round.

Pawbenders 
Good Times also serves Pawbenders, which are frozen treats created for dogs. They contain vanilla Frozen Custard, three Milk Bones, and a Peanut Butter Drizzle. A percentage of the money made from every Pawbender sold goes to support the Dumb Friends League, Freedom Service Dogs of America, and/or the Larimer Humane Society.

See also
 List of frozen custard companies
 List of hamburger restaurants

References

External links
Official website

Companies based in Golden, Colorado
Restaurants in Colorado
Economy of the Western United States
Fast-food chains of the United States
Regional restaurant chains in the United States
Fast-food hamburger restaurants
Restaurants established in 1987
Fast-food franchises
Frozen custard
Ice cream parlors in the United States